1961 is an album by Canadian electronic musician Aaron Funk under the moniker of Last Step.
It is in an electronic music style similar to the Aphex Twin Analord series but exhibiting the odd meters typical of Funk. The album is released by Planet Mu both as a CD and as 3x12"

Track listing

Personnel 

 Aaron Funk - composition

References

2008 albums
Planet Mu albums
Venetian Snares albums